Zachary "Zach" Mason is an American former soccer player who last played college soccer for Ohio State University. While at Ohio State, Mason won the Senior CLASS Award for men's soccer, a national recognition for the most outstanding senior in men's collegiate soccer.

Following his playing career, Mason was an assistant coach for the Bowling Green Falcons men's soccer program from 2016 until 2018.

Career

Youth and college 
Mason finished his college soccer career making 82 appearances for Ohio State, scoring one goal.
On December 10, 2015, Mason won the Senior CLASS Award for men's soccer.

Coaching career 
On June 24, 2016, Mason joined the coaching staff at Bowling Green State University. He left in December 2018.

References 

1994 births
Living people
American soccer players
Association football midfielders
Bowling Green Falcons men's soccer coaches
National Premier Soccer League players
Ohio State Buckeyes men's soccer players
People from Delaware County, Ohio
Soccer players from Ohio
American soccer coaches